This Machine Kills Secrets is a 2012 book by Andy Greenberg about "how WikiLeakers, cypherpunks, and hacktivists aim to free the world's information." The book looks at "a revolutionary protest movement bent not on stealing information, but on building a tool that inexorably coaxes it out, a technology that slips inside of institutions and levels their defenses like a Trojan horse of cryptographic software and silicon." The interview with Julian Assange that served as a launching point for the book was published by Forbes and read nearly a million times.

The book looks at the history of "politically motivated information leaks ... the lives and work of numerous cryptographers, hackers and whistleblowers", including WikiLeaks and the people involved. It talks about WikiLeaks being modeled on Nicolas Bourbaki, and how it could be infiltrated by informers, harassed or spied on.

See also
Crypto-anarchism
Cypherpunk
Hacktivism

References

2012 non-fiction books
Works about whistleblowing
WikiLeaks
E. P. Dutton books